Hierodula coarctata is a species of praying mantis in the family Mantidae.

References

coarctata
Articles created by Qbugbot
Insects described in 1869